Wieprz is a village in Wadowice County, Lesser Poland Voivodeship, in southern Poland. It is the seat of the gmina (administrative district) called Gmina Wieprz.

The village has a population of 5,002.

References

Wieprz